Westmark is a 1981 fantasy novel by Lloyd Alexander, named for a fictional kingdom that is its setting. Alternatively, Westmark is a trilogy named for the novel, its first book. The novel won a 1982 National Book Award.

Showing influences of the French existentialist writers whose works Alexander translated early in his career, the series is far darker and more adult than his previous books for children including The Chronicles of Prydain. Although classified as fantasy, there is no magic, nor any sign of religious belief, in Westmark or the succeeding volumes.

The novel tells a story of political upheaval and revolution strikingly similar to the history of the French Revolution, as seen through the eyes of a young printer's apprentice who goes on the run after his master is murdered. It leads directly into the second volume of the trilogy, The Kestrel.

Plot summary

It is a complicated and politically dangerous period in Westmark. The country's ruler, King Augustine IV, has slipped into dementia, depression and illness since the supposed death of his only child, Princess Augusta, over six years ago. Despite the efforts of the queen, Caroline, and the court physician, Dr. Torrens, the King is increasingly manipulated by his chief minister, Cabbarus, who has designs on the throne. While the ill king is kept distracted by a series of mystics and charlatans who claim to be able to speak to his dead child, Cabbarus increases his control over Westmark, restricting freedoms and abusing the king's powers.

Young Theo, an orphan, has been raised in a small town, Dorning, by a printer named Anton. After the pair accepts a job from a travelling salesman they are investigated by Cabbarus' men, who declare their job illegal and proceed to destroy their press. In the ensuing scuffle and chase, Theo attacks a soldier and Anton is shot and killed.

With no one else to turn to, Theo takes to the countryside, eventually meeting up with the men who hired him and Anton for the printing job: Count Las Bombas, a con artist, and his dwarf driver/partner Musket. Theo joins up with them, rather reluctantly, and ends up participating in their money-making schemes. They eventually discover a girl named Mickle, a poor street urchin, who has a talent for throwing her voice and mimicry. The count builds a charade around Mickle, dressing her up as the Oracle Priestess and putting her on display, claiming that she can speak to the spirits of the dead.

Theo, despite his growing affection for the bright but vulnerable Mickle, begins to find his new life too dishonest for his tastes and abandons the group, eventually falling in with Florian, an anti-monarchist and rebel who plans revolution with his band of loyal followers whom he calls his "children". Meanwhile, Mickle, Las Bombas, and Musket have been arrested for fraud, Cabbarus has attempted to have Dr. Torrens assassinated and a politically minded journalist, Keller, goes into hiding to save himself from Cabbarus' wrath.

Events come to a head when Theo plots to break his old companions out of prison, with help from Florian and his friends. Their reunion, however, does not last long; Cabbarus has tracked them down and has them all arrested. He brings the group to the Old Juliana, the palace of King Augustine IV and Queen Caroline, where reveals his plans to the group and of how the "Oracle Priestess" will be his pawn to his uprising to the throne. While in Old Juliana, Mickle comes across a trapdoor leading to a water canal, and her memories race in her mind as she remembers her childhood. This leads to her high fever and Theo's worry of her having to act. Cabbarus presents the group to the King and Queen and the courtiers as the Oracle Priestess, and suddenly Mickle's long-repressed childhood memories come to the surface, revealing treason, attempted murder and corruption in the heart of the Westmark government. It is later revealed that Mickle is the long-lost Princess Augusta and that chief minister Cabbarus was responsible for her disappearance.

Eventually, on the subject of Cabbarus's punishment, Theo, on behalf of his conscience, sends him into exile, instead of killing him. This decision will have a major effect on the final book of the Westmark trilogy, The Beggar Queen.

Characters 

Augustine IV – King of Westmark
Caroline – Queen of Westmark
Augusta – Princess
Theo – young printer's apprentice, orphan and protagonist
Cabbarus – manipulative chief minister to the King
Mickle – poor street urchin
Florian – anti-monarchist and rebel 
Count Las Bombas – con man
Dr. Torrens – court physician
Musket – dwarf driver, partner to Las Bombas, from the beggar factory
Skeit – Bad person who swindles Las Bombas and later partners up with Cabbarus

Series

The Westmark trilogy is a fantasy without magic or any sign of religious belief. It has been called "historical fantasy, set in a time much like our 18th century".
There are mentions of Upper Brasil and the Roman Pantheon.
Westmark (1981)
The Kestrel (1982)
The Beggar Queen (1984)

The Kestrel features Westmark invaded by a larger, more militaristic neighboring kingdom, Regia -- possibly an analogue of Prussia, as Westmark is of France. Theo becomes one of the leaders of the resistance fighters operating behind the Regian lines, under the nom de guerre "the Kestrel". One reviewer calls it "an imaginary kingdom with a post-Napoleonic cast".

The Beggar Queen features Westmark in transition, with the former urchin Mickle now its queen.

Awards 

1982 - National Book Award for Children's Books, category Fiction (hardcover).

Notes

References 

American fantasy novels
National Book Award for Young People's Literature winning works
Novels by Lloyd Alexander
Westmark Trilogy
1981 American novels
E. P. Dutton books